In Ireland, counties are divided into civil parishes and parishes are further divided into townlands. The following is a list of parishes in County Fermanagh, Northern Ireland:

A
Arney, Aghalurcher, Aghavea, Aghavea-Aughintaine

B
Belleek, Boho, Botha

C
Clogher, Clones, Culmaine

D
Derrybrusk, Derryvullan, Devenish, Drumkeeran, Drummully

E
Enniskillen

G
Galloon

I
Inishmacsaint, Inis Muighe Samh

K
Killesher, Kinawley, Kilskeery

M
Magheracross, Magheraculmoney

P
Pobal

R
Rossory, Roslea

T
Templecarn, Tomregan, Trory

See also
List of townlands in County Fermanagh

References

 
Fermanagh
Civil parishes